Harvey Lee Watkins Jr. (born November 2, 1954) is an American gospel musician and currently the lead singer of The Canton Spirituals, which his father Harvey Watkins Sr. founded. He started his solo music career, in 1990, with the release of, He's There All the Time, that was released by J&B Records. His second album, It's in My Heart – Live in Raymond, MS, released by Verity Records in 2003, and this placed on the Billboard magazine Gospel Albums chart. The third album, Keep Knocking, was released in 2013 by Malaco Records, but this did not place on any charts.

Early life
Watkins was born on November 2, 1954, as Harvey Lee Watkins Jr. in Canton, Mississippi, 
He was named after his father Mr. Harvey Lee Watkins Sr. and to Mrs. Emma Watkins. Harvey was their first son and fourth child. He was stricken with Polio, as a three-year-old, and was healed by prayer. He was influenced by his fathers band, The Canton Spirituals which included his uncle, the late Reverend I. S. Watkins. Ever since he was a child he loved their singing and he later became a member in 1973. He is still currently the lead singer for the group and he still continues to tour.

Music career
His solo music recording career commenced in 1990, with the release of He's There All the Time by J&B Records on October 17, 1990. The subsequent album, It's in My Heart – Live in Raymond, MS, was released on June 17, 2003 by Verity Records, and this was his Billboard magazine breakthrough album upon the Gospel Albums chart at No. 11.

Discography

References

External links
 Cross Rhythms artist profile

1954 births
Living people
African-American songwriters
African-American Christians
Musicians from Mississippi
Songwriters from Mississippi
21st-century African-American people
20th-century African-American people